This is a list of electoral results for the electoral district of Burrum in Queensland state elections.

Members for Burrum

The following people were elected in the seat of Burrum:

Election results

Elections in the 1920s

Elections in the 1910s

References

Queensland state electoral results by district